Theodor August Buhl (baptised August Theodor Buhl; 16 May 1865 – 11 October 1922) was a British stamp dealer in London who published Stamp News, which he also edited until 1895.

Buhl was born in Frankfurt, the eldest of six children of music professor/composer Carl Friedrich August Buhl (anglicised to Charles Frederick Augustus Buhl) and Sophie Friederike (Sophia Frederica), née De Barÿ. The family emigrated when he was a small child, settling in Lambeth, London.

In 1890, Buhl was offered the business of Stanley Gibbons, who was retiring, but declined it as too expensive at £20,000. It was subsequently sold to Charles Phillips for £25,000. In 1892, he bought the business of Pemberton, Wilson & Co (London), and with it the rights to The Philatelic Record which he later merged with Stamp News. In the same year he was a witness at the trial of Bernhardt Assmus. Buhl kept a general stock but specialised in the stamps of South America and Messrs. Buhl and Co., Limited sponsored a Gold Medal for the best collection of the stamps of Peru at the London Philatelic Exhibition of 1897.

Publications
The Stamp News Annual (various years)

See also
Edward Loines Pemberton

References

1865 births
1922 deaths
German emigrants to England
British stamp dealers
People from Lambeth